This is a list of cases reported in volume 11 (7 Cranch) of United States Reports, decided by the Supreme Court of the United States in 1812 and 1813.

Nominative reports 
In 1874, the U.S. government created the United States Reports, and retroactively numbered older privately-published case reports as part of the new series.  As a result, cases appearing in volumes 1–90 of U.S. Reports have dual citation forms; one for the volume number of U.S. Reports, and one for the volume number of the reports named for the relevant reporter of decisions (these are called "nominative reports").

William Cranch 
Starting with the 5th volume of U.S. Reports, the Reporter of Decisions of the Supreme Court of the United States was William Cranch. Cranch was Reporter of Decisions from 1801 to 1815, covering volumes 5 through 13 of United States Reports which correspond to volumes 1 through 9 of his Cranch's Reports. As such, the dual form of citation to, for example, Wells v. United States is 11 U.S. (7 Cranch) 22 (1812).

Justices of the Supreme Court at the time of 11 U.S. (7 Cranch) 

The Supreme Court is established by Article III, Section 1 of the Constitution of the United States, which says: "The judicial Power of the United States, shall be vested in one supreme Court . . .". The size of the Court is not specified; the Constitution leaves it to Congress to set the number of justices. Under the Judiciary Act of 1789 Congress originally fixed the number of justices at six (one chief justice and five associate justices). Since 1789 Congress has  varied the size of the Court from six to seven, nine, ten, and back to nine justices (always including one chief justice).

When the cases in 11 U.S. (7 Cranch) were decided, the Court comprised these seven justices:

Notable cases in 11 U.S. (7 Cranch)

United States v. Hudson 
In United States v. Hudson, 11 U.S. (7 Cranch) 32 (1812), the Court held that Congress must first enact a constitutional law criminalizing an activity, attach a penalty, and give the federal courts jurisdiction over the offense for a federal court to render a conviction.

The Schooner Exchange v. M'Faddon 
In The Schooner Exchange v. McFaddon, 11 U.S. (7 Cranch) 116 (1812), the Court considered the jurisdiction of federal courts over a claim against a friendly foreign military vessel visiting an American port. The court interpreted customary international law to determine that there was no federal jurisdiction.

Fairfax's Devisee v. Hunter's Lessee 
Fairfax's Devisee v. Hunter's Lessee, 11 U.S. (7 Cranch) 603 (1813), was a case arising out of the acquisition of land in Virginia. For the Court, Justice Joseph Story refused to accept as final the Virginia Court of Appeals' interpretation of Virginia law.  He found that precedents in Virginia law itself upheld the titles in question. Story's decision to "look into" Virginia law was a vital step in securing federal supremacy. Otherwise, the federal courts could be effectively blocked, by a state court's decision, from addressing a federal question — in this case a British national's rights under treaties with Britain.

Queen v. Hepburn 

Queen v. Hepburn, 11 U.S. (7 Cranch) 290 (1813), was a case in which a Maryland slave sued for her freedom.  In support of her claim, her attorney offered several depositions containing testimony favorable to her.  Chief Justice Marshall, who was a slave-owner, affirmed the lower court's judgment against the woman on the basis that the deposition statements were hearsay, and so were properly excluded from evidence.  Dissenting, Justice Gabriel Duvall of Maryland, although also a slave-owner, pointed out that under Maryland law certain hearsay can legitimately be admitted to establish land boundaries, and that hearsay in cases involving freedom should be admitted as well.

Duvall wrote: 
It will be universally admitted that the right to freedom is more important than the right of property. And people of color from their helpless condition under the uncontrolled authority of a master, are entitled to all reasonable protection. A decision that hearsay evidence in such cases shall not be admitted, cuts up by the roots all claims of the kind, and puts a final end to them, unless the claim should arise from a fact of recent date, and such a case will seldom, perhaps never, occur."

Citation style 

Under the Judiciary Act of 1789 the federal court structure at the time comprised District Courts, which had general trial jurisdiction; Circuit Courts, which had mixed trial and appellate (from the US District Courts) jurisdiction; and the United States Supreme Court, which had appellate jurisdiction over the federal District and Circuit courts—and for certain issues over state courts. The Supreme Court also had limited original jurisdiction (i.e., in which cases could be filed directly with the Supreme Court without first having been heard by a lower federal or state court). There were one or more federal District Courts and/or Circuit Courts in each state, territory, or other geographical region.

Bluebook citation style is used for case names, citations, and jurisdictions.  
 e.g.,"C.C.D.N.J." = United States Circuit Court for the District of New Jersey
 e.g.,"D. Mass." = United States District Court for the District of Massachusetts 
 "E." = Eastern; "M." = Middle; "N." = Northern; "S." = Southern; "W." = Western
 e.g.,"C.C.S.D.N.Y." = United States Circuit Court for the Southern District of New York
 e.g.,"M.D. Ala." = United States District Court for the Middle District of Alabama
 "Ct. Cl." = United States Court of Claims
 The abbreviation of a state's name alone indicates the highest appellate court in that state's judiciary at the time. 
 e.g.,"Pa." = Supreme Court of Pennsylvania
 e.g.,"Me." = Supreme Judicial Court of Maine

List of cases in 11 U.S. (7 Cranch)

Notes and references

See also
 certificate of division

External links
  Case reports in volume 11 (7 Cranch) from Court Listener
  Case reports in volume 11 (7 Cranch) from the Caselaw Access Project of Harvard Law School
  Case reports in volume 11 (7 Cranch) from Google Scholar
  Case reports in volume 11 (7 Cranch) from Justia
  Case reports in volume 11 (7 Cranch) from Open Jurist
 Website of the United States Supreme Court
 United States Courts website about the Supreme Court
 National Archives, Records of the Supreme Court of the United States
 American Bar Association, How Does the Supreme Court Work?
 The Supreme Court Historical Society

1812 in United States case law
1813 in United States case law